Siempre habrá un mañana (English: There's Always Tomorrow), is a Mexican telenovela produced by Valentín Pimstein for Televisa in 1974. Meche Carreño and Eduardo Alcaraz star as the protagonists, while Aurora Molina star as the antagonists.

Is an adaptation of the Venezuelan telenovela "María Mercé, La Chinita" produced in 1970 by Venevisión.

Plot 
Plot tells the life of Mercedes a young and humble washerwoman who one day meets Arthur a young graduate who comes from the capital and has just arrived at the village, Arturo and Mercedes fall in love, he has to return to the capital and she agrees to wait for him, returning to the capital Arturo meets a woman of high societywho fell in love with it, and as an ambition to agree to marry, Arturo no can tell the truth to Mercedes since this ravaging it, however the poor washerwoman ended by learning the worst way of cruel deception of her beloved. At the end Mercedes finds true love in another man that that values her, but there another obstacle to be happy, his girlfriend Pilar.

Cast 
 Meche Carreño as Mercedes
 Eduardo Alcaraz as Carlos 
 Aurora Molina as Pilar
 Malena Doria as Asunción
 Maria Eugenia Avendaño
 Rosa Furman
 Gastón Melo as Arturo
 Mario Casillas
 Eugenia Avendaño
 Alejandro Rey
 Carlos Rotzinger
 Gloria Maestre

References

External links 

Mexican telenovelas
1974 telenovelas
Televisa telenovelas
1974 Mexican television series debuts
1974 Mexican television series endings
Mexican television series based on Venezuelan television series
Spanish-language telenovelas